John Joseph Harrington Jr.  (born October 21, 1978) is a former American football quarterback who played in the National Football League (NFL) for seven seasons, primarily with the Detroit Lions. He played college football at Oregon, where he was named Pac-10 Offensive Player of the Year as a senior, and was selected third overall by the Lions in the 2002 NFL Draft. Unable to duplicate his collegiate success, Harrington left the Lions after four seasons. Harrington spent his final three seasons as the primary starter for the Miami Dolphins and Atlanta Falcons and a backup with the New Orleans Saints.

Early years
Harrington was born and raised in Portland, Oregon. He graduated from Central Catholic High School in Portland, and finished his high school career with more than 4,200 yards and 50 touchdowns rushing and passing.

Harrington's grandfather and father played quarterback for the Universities of Portland and Oregon, respectively, and upon hearing of Joey's birth, legendary Oregon Ducks' coach Len Casanova jokingly sent his parents a letter-of-intent.

College career
Harrington is a graduate of the University of Oregon, and was a three-year starter on the Oregon Ducks football team. In his senior season at Oregon, he threw for 2,415 yards and 23 touchdowns, and he finished his college career with a 25-3 record (including bowl wins against #12 Texas and #3 Colorado), 512 completions in 928 attempts (55.2%), 6,911 passing yards, 59 touchdowns, 23 interceptions, and 210 rushing yards and 18 scores on 145 carries. A business administration major with a 3.23 GPA (twice earning honors with a 3.34 GPA), Harrington's 7,121 yards of total offense rank sixth in University of Oregon history.

Harrington finished fourth in the voting for the Heisman Trophy in 2001, following a campaign for the award that included a billboard in Times Square promoting him as "Joey Heisman." He earned numerous honors, including first-team All-American, Pac-10 Offensive Player of the Year, and second-team honors from The Sporting News. He was one of five finalists for the Johnny Unitas Golden Arm Award in 2001. EA Sports selected him for the cover of the 2003 edition of their NCAA Football video game series. Harrington was given the nickname "Captain Comeback" among fans for his ability to lead Oregon to victory in late game situations, accumulating a record of 11-2 in games in which the Ducks trailed or were tied in the fourth quarter.

Harrington's best collegiate game was arguably the 2002 Tostitos Fiesta Bowl at Sun Devil Stadium in Tempe, Arizona when he threw for 350 yards and four touchdowns and helped lead the Ducks to a 38-16 victory over Colorado. Harrington was named offensive player of the game.

Harrington's worst game was arguably the 2000 Civil War in which he passed 24-36 for 333 yards, but threw five interceptions. Three of those interceptions were by Oregon State defensive back Jake Cookus. #8 Oregon State ultimately won 23-13 over then-#6 Oregon.

College statistics

Professional career

Detroit Lions
Harrington was selected by the Detroit Lions with the third pick overall in the 2002 NFL Draft. Harrington took over for incumbent Mike McMahon late in the Lions' Week 1 loss against the Miami Dolphins and became the Lions' starting quarterback shortly thereafter, finishing that year with a 50.1 completion percentage, a ratio of 12 touchdowns to 16 interceptions, and a 59.9 quarterback rating; the Lions finished the season with a 3–13 record. He was named the 2002 recipient of the Detroit Lions/Detroit Sports Broadcasters Association Rookie of the Year Award.

Harrington's career in Detroit was largely unsuccessful. Front office mismanagement, woeful offensive line protection, lack of talent at other skill positions, and an erratic philosophical change in the team's identity to a conservative West Coast Offense (WCO) oriented attack under Head Coach Steve Mariucci may have played a factor in Harrington not realizing his potential professionally, as well as his own play and lack of talent. Harrington's best season as a Lion came in 2004, when he threw for 19 touchdowns and 12 interceptions. The Lions started the season with a 4–2 record, but Harrington led the team to only two more wins the rest of the season. The Lions finished 6–10 and missed the playoffs for the fifth season in a row.

On October 23, 2005, Mariucci chose to bench Harrington in favour of veteran Jeff Garcia for the team's game against the Cleveland Browns to try to provide a spark to the team's 2–3 start. The Lions won 13–10, and Garcia rushed for Detroit's only touchdown. After yet another dismal offensive performance, Mariucci declared that Garcia would remain the starter. That marked the first time since the 2002 season that Harrington did not appear in a Lions' game, breaking a string of 37 consecutive appearances. Harrington regained the starting role the week after Garcia threw a game-ending interception returned for a touchdown in overtime against Chicago. Harrington started again for Detroit on November 13, 2005, against the Arizona Cardinals, throwing for three touchdowns without an interception in the Lions' 29–21 win. Harrington was voted by Lions fans as their Offensive Player of the Year, according to the Lions' official website. Despite his difficult times in Detroit, he remained unwaveringly optimistic and was thus dubbed "Joey Blue-Skies" and "Joey Sunshine" by sarcastic Lions' fans and beat writers who grew tired of his predictable post-game commentary as the losses continued to mount.

Trade to Miami
After the 2005 season, Detroit signed free agents Jon Kitna and Josh McCown, and traded Harrington to the Miami Dolphins on May 12, 2006, for a fifth-round draft pick in 2007, after meeting performance stipulations in Miami (the pick was later traded to the New Orleans Saints). Harrington started the 2006 season as a backup behind new Dolphins quarterback Daunte Culpepper. During his tenure with the Lions, Harrington started 55 games and had a record of 18 wins and 37 losses.

Miami Dolphins
In 2006, Harrington did not play in the Dolphins' first four games, backing up Culpepper. Culpepper injured his shoulder prior to Miami's fifth game against the New England Patriots, forcing Harrington into the starting role.  Harrington lost his first three starts, before leading Miami to a 31–13 win over the previously unbeaten (7–0 at the time) Chicago Bears. Harrington followed that game with four consecutive victories. Harrington capped off this winning streak in front of a national television audience on Thanksgiving Day in Detroit with a 27–10 victory at Ford Field against his former team.  Harrington passed for 3 touchdowns and 213 yards against Detroit, compiling a passer rating of 107.4, his highest single game rating for 2006.  Harrington struggled after the Lions' game.  Against the Buffalo Bills in Week 15, Harrington went 5-for-17 for 20 yards, throwing two interceptions.  His passer rating for the game was 0.0, the minimum possible under the complex NFL formula.  Harrington was pulled midway through Miami's next game against the New York Jets, replaced in the 13–10 Christmas night loss by Cleo Lemon.  Harrington did not appear in Miami's Week 17 finale against the Indianapolis Colts.  Overall, Harrington played in and started eleven games, leading Miami to a 5–6 record (Miami finished 6–10 for the season as a whole).

Atlanta Falcons
On April 9, 2007, Harrington agreed to a two-year, $6 million contract with the Atlanta Falcons to compete with D. J. Shockley and Chris Redman to be the backup quarterback to Michael Vick.

Harrington was elevated to starting quarterback after the suspension of Vick for the 2007 NFL season. Harrington performed well in the preseason, but after going 0–2, Atlanta signed quarterback Byron Leftwich as a possible replacement for Harrington. During the Week 3 Atlanta home opener against the division rival Carolina Panthers, Harrington completed 31-of-44 passes with two touchdowns and no interceptions for a 110.1 passer rating in a 27–20 loss. In Week 4, Harrington improved on his numbers with a 121.7 passer rating, completing 23-of-29 passes for two touchdowns with no interceptions, leading the Falcons to their first win of the 2007 season.

On March 5, 2008, the Falcons released Harrington in a salary cap move. He was re-signed by the team seven days later but was again released in August after the Falcons completed their preseason schedule.

New Orleans Saints
Harrington signed with the New Orleans Saints on September 19, 2008. He was the third-string quarterback behind Drew Brees and Mark Brunell for one game against the Denver Broncos. He was released only five days later on September 24, 2008, due to increasing injuries on the Saints roster. After the Saints' injury situation became more manageable, Harrington was re-signed on October 1, but was cut again on October 6. He once again re-signed with the Saints on October 12, 2008, as an inactive third-string quarterback.

On March 30, 2009, Harrington was re-signed to a one-year deal by the Saints. He was released by the team again on September 5, 2009.

After being cut by the Saints, Harrington would not sign with another NFL team.

Performance assessment
Harrington was first given the label of "Savior" by fans and media in Detroit - then deemed a "bust" when he did not meet high expectations. Many speculate that his premature start in the NFL, along with lack of surrounding talent, poor coaching, and questionable offensive lines have affected his performance severely. Many other quarterbacks, such as Tim Couch and David Carr, were also drafted highly and eventually lost their starting jobs.

In 2005, former quarterback Troy Aikman wrote that Harrington "can still be a really good quarterback in this league," and does not deserve the blame for what happened in Detroit: "The focus on Joey's play has given every other player a hall pass, and that's not right."

Former quarterback Phil Simms said in 2006 that Harrington got a bad rap in Detroit. "I am not a Joey Harrington basher. The quarterback can't overcome bad coaching and bad players." Former quarterback Dan Marino said that he did not believe that Harrington had the necessary pieces around him in Detroit to be successful, but that he might be OK in a different place.

When Lions head coach Steve Mariucci was fired by general manager Matt Millen, Lions cornerback Dré Bly told analyst Rich Eisen in an NFL Total Access interview that he blamed Harrington for the dismissal of Mariucci. Bly later apologized to the Lions, but not to Harrington.

Some fingers were also pointed at the Lions' management and coaching staff. Fellow Lions quarterback Jeff Garcia publicly questioned the team's front office, saying on WXYT that "You start to question whether the organization has the people in place who can go about making the proper selections." Former defensive end Howie Long said that Millen made a mistake by drafting Harrington, along with signing Garcia instead of Brad Johnson.

NFL career statistics

NFL awards
 FedEx Air Player of the Week – Week 1, 2003

Personal life
Harrington married Emily Hatten on March 10, 2007.  They have two sons, born in 2009 and 2012.  Emily is a nurse practitioner, and Harrington spoke about them opening a medical clinic to serve the homeless in Portland, after he retired from football.  Harrington is an accomplished jazz pianist who has occasionally performed with artists such as Jason Mraz, Blues Traveler, and Third Eye Blind.  On February 1, 2008, Harrington appeared as a guest chef on a special Super Bowl episode of The Rachael Ray Show. Harrington is a distant cousin of professional golfer Pádraig Harrington and professional poker player Dan Harrington. Harrington's brother, Michael, played football at the University of Idaho, and was also a quarterback.

Harrington was the guest on the February 2, 2008, episode NPR's Wait, Wait...Don't Tell Me!, as a guest during the 'Not My Job' segment.

Harrington and his family moved back to Portland after his release from the Saints in September 2009. He is spending more time with his wife and family, and the numerous charities in which he is involved. He co-owned the Pearl Tavern, a restaurant in Portland's Pearl District, which opened in 2016 and closed in 2018.

On July 31, 2011, Harrington was struck by an SUV while riding his bicycle in Portland, Oregon. Harrington suffered a broken collarbone and a punctured lung and fractured his first two ribs below his collarbone and also got six staples in his head behind his right ear due to the accident.

Broadcasting
In 2009, Harrington worked as an NFL and college football commentator for Fox Sports Radio. In 2010, he served as a color analyst for Oregon Ducks football games on Oregon Sports Network.
Currently, Harrington is a college football analyst for Fox College Football on FX and Fox. He is also a general assignment reporter with KGW Television on a part-time basis in Portland, Oregon.

Philanthropy
Harrington established the Harrington Family Foundation in 2003 as a nonprofit organization with the goal of supporting youth education and activities as well as other miscellaneous benefits. Harrington's parents, John and Valerie Harrington, run the foundation.

The foundation began with a portion of Joey's signing bonus with the Detroit Lions. It raises further money by selling memorabilia items and booking events. After being given the New York Times Square "Joey Heisman" billboard by the former Oregon Ducks Athletic Director Bill Moos, he proceeded to cut it up and sell the pieces for charity. All the proceeds from the sales went toward scholarships for the University of Oregon.

See also
 O (gesture), a hand signal popularized by Harrington

References

External links

The Harrington Family Foundation
ESPN profile

1978 births
Living people
American football quarterbacks
Atlanta Falcons players
College football announcers
Detroit Lions players
Miami Dolphins players
New Orleans Saints players
Oregon Ducks football players
Oregon Ducks football announcers
Players of American football from Portland, Oregon
Central Catholic High School (Portland, Oregon) alumni